Ophiusa recurvata  is a moth of the family Erebidae. It is found in Africa, including Ghana.

References

Endemic fauna of Ghana
Ophiusa
Insects of West Africa
Moths of Africa
Moths described in 1913